La Wis Wis Guard Station No. 1165 in Gifford Pinchot National Forest near Packwood, Washington was built by the Civilian Conservation Corps.  It is a -story wood-frame structure on a concrete foundation.  It was designed by the Region 6 architects of the United States Forest Service in Rustic style.

It was listed on the U.S. National Register of Historic Places in 1986.

References

United States Forest Service ranger stations
Civilian Conservation Corps in Washington (state)
Park buildings and structures on the National Register of Historic Places in Washington (state)
Buildings and structures in Lewis County, Washington
Rustic architecture in Washington (state)
National Register of Historic Places in Lewis County, Washington